The 1956 United States presidential election in Delaware took place on November 6, 1956, as part of the 1956 United States presidential election. State voters chose three representatives, or electors, to the Electoral College, who voted for president and vice president.

Delaware was won by incumbent President Dwight D. Eisenhower (R–Pennsylvania), running with Vice President Richard Nixon, with 55.09% of the popular vote, against Adlai Stevenson (D–Illinois), running with Senator Estes Kefauver, with 44.62% of the popular vote. As of 2022, this is the last time that Sussex County was not the most Republican county in the state.

Results

Results by county

See also
 United States presidential elections in Delaware

References

Delaware
1956
1956 Delaware elections